Helena Noguerra (18 May 1969) is a Belgian actress, singer and writer.

Career 
Noguerra was born in Brussels, Belgium. Her songs have been used in commercials and television programmes such as Lunettes noires pour nuits blanches by Thierry Ardisson (1988–1990). She sang on the 2009 video game Bayonetta, including both the game's main theme Mysterious Destiny and a cover of Fly Me to the Moon.

In 2010 she toured with French band Nouvelle Vague.

Personal life 
She is the sister of singer Lio.

She has a son, Tanel Derard, born in 1991, a musician and model.

Filmography

Theater

Discography

Albums 
 1998 : Projet : bikini
 2001 : Azul
 2004 : Née dans la nature
 2007 : Fraise Vanille
 2013 : Année zéro
 2019 : Nue

Singles 
 1989 : Lunettes noires
 1992 : Rivière des anges

Collaborations 
 1987 : La Bamba ft. Los Portos & Lio
 1996 : Ollano ft. Nouvelle Vague
 2003 : L'Héroïne au bain ft. Olivier Libaux
 2004 : Jeux d'amour / La Fête ft. Rodrigo Leão, Beth Gibbons & Sakamoto
 2005 : Le Téléfon on the album On Dirait Nino
 2006 : Dillinger Girl et Baby Face Nelson ft. Federico Pellegrini
 2007 : Imbécile ft. Olivier Libaux
 2007 : Helena et Rezvani en concert ft. Serge Rezvani
 2009 : Masquez les plumes ft. Gregory Cerkinsky, Philippe Eveno & Florence Denou
 2010 : Theme of Bayonetta: Mysterious Destiny, Fly Me to the Moon
 2010 : So in love ft. André Manoukian
 2010 : C'est pas ft. François Morel
 2014 : Rio-Paris ft. Natalie Dessay, Agnès Jaoui & Liat Cohen
 2014 : Dans la mer aussi il y a des étoiles ft. Alain Rivet
 2018 : Les Parisiennes ft. Arielle Dombasle, Mareva Galanter & Inna Modja

Author

References

External links

 
 Portrait et discographie d'Helena Noguerra

1969 births
Living people
Belgian film actresses
Belgian television actresses
Belgian television presenters
Belgian people of Portuguese descent
French-language singers of Belgium
Portuguese-language singers of Belgium
Actresses from Brussels
ZE Records artists
21st-century Belgian actresses
Noguerra, Helena
Belgian women television presenters